"Mercedes Benz" is an a cappella song written by the American singer Janis Joplin with Bob Neuwirth, and the poet Michael McClure. The song was originally recorded by Joplin. A straightforward reading of the song lyrics indicate that the song is about the desire for possessions and pleasure; but at least one writer considers it to be a rejection of consumerism.

History

The song's lyrics were written at Vahsen's, a Port Chester, New York bar, on August 8, 1970, during an impromptu poetry jam between Joplin and songwriter Bob Neuwirth. The lyrics were inspired by the first line of a song written by the San Francisco beat poet Michael McClure, "Come on, God, and buy me a Mercedes Benz." Joplin heard it sung by a friend of McClure's, and she began to sing it too. 

At the Port Chester bar, Joplin sang the line a few times and began riffing on McClure lyrics, while Neuwirth copied the new lyrics onto bar napkins, which he kept for years afterwards. She sang the new version for the first time that night at her concert at Capitol Theatre in Port Chester. Bobby Womack asserts in his autobiography that Joplin was inspired to come up with the lyrics after going for a ride with him in his new Mercedes-Benz 600.

In the song, Joplin asks God to prove his love for her by buying her a Mercedes-Benz automobile, a color TV, and a "night on the town." There is also a reference to Dialing for Dollars, a franchised format local television program, which required a person to be watching the show to win a prize when the show called the person’s phone number, hence the singer's need for a TV. It was the last song Joplin recorded before her death. 

The song was recorded in one take during a recording session on October 1, 1970. These were the last tracks Joplin ever recorded as she died three days later, on October 4. The song appeared on the album Pearl, released in 1971. The song title, as listed on that album, contains no hyphen although the actual automobile brand name is hyphenated as Mercedes-Benz.  

In 2003, Joplin's recording was remixed, adding a beat and a background melody. The remixed version was included on collections of Joplin's greatest hits.

Cover versions
 1971 – Elton John covered the song briefly on his American tour
 1972 – the song was covered by the Goose Creek Symphony, becoming their best-known recording, peaking at #64 on the US Hot 100 and #49 in Canada.
 1974 – Bob Neuwirth recorded a country style version on his debut self titled album.
 1974 – The Supremes covered the song with their own lyrics, with all three members (Cindy Birdsong, Mary Wilson and Scherrie Payne) singing on lead
 1976 – the song was covered by the British folk group Swan Arcade
 1980 – German singer-songwriter Klaus Lage recorded a version in German language
 1992 – French-Canadian pop star Mitsou recorded a dance-pop version of the song on her EP Heading West
 1992 – Norwegian vocal pop group Bjelleklang recorded a Norwegian-language version on their album Holiholihooo ...
 1994 – Bob Rivers released a parody titled "Honda Accord"
 1994 – a cover version was made by a Dutch pop/dance band T-Spoon
 1995 – a version was included on Gina Jeffreys' album, The Flame
 1996 – a live cover version was included on the Concrete Blonde compilation Recollection: The Best of Concrete Blonde
 1996 – a cover version was included in Live at The Roxy, a live album by Argentinean singer Celeste Carballo.
 1997 – American blues artist Taj Mahal covered the song for the compilation album Blues Down Deep: Songs of Janis Joplin
 1997 – a cover version was made by the Italian pop/dance singer Spagna, and included as a ghost track on her album Indivisibili
 1998 – former Guns N' Roses rhythm guitarist Gilby Clarke included a version of the song on his album Rubber
 1998 – Brazilian countertenor, pop and jazz singer Edson Cordeiro covered the song in his 1998 album Disco Clubbing ao Vivo
 1999 – the EP Humppaorgiat by the Finnish comedy group Eläkeläiset featured a cover titled KELA, the lyrics requesting for a moped, a submachine gun, a blow-up doll, a stocked medicine cabinet and for "many things truly awesome" from the Social Insurance Institution
 1999 – the Japanese adult video star Miki Sawaguchi included a cover version of the song on her album Big Boobs/Watashi no Mune de Onemurinasai. Her version is also a capella, and sung in thickly-accented English
 2000 – a re-make by Hubert von Goisern on his album Fön (2000)
 2001 – the key line was interpolated into the opera Jeppe: The Cruel Comedy
 2006 – Pink covered the song on her I'm Not Dead Tour
 2009 – a cover version was made by Kendel Carson and released on her album Alright Dynamite
 2009 – the Portuguese Star Maria Ana Charrua covered the song in the Portuguese version of "the Idols"
 2009 - Canadian jazz trumpeter and vocalist Bria Skonberg recorded the song on her debut album, Fresh
 2010 – a version recorded by Dave Clark & Friends in the early 1970s was released
 2010 – the song was covered by Jon Boden as part of his A Folk Song a Day project
 2010 – a cover version by Jackyl on the When Moonshine and Dynamite Collide album
 2011 – a cover version by Chimène Badi on the Gospel & Soul album
 2011 – hip-hop artist G-Eazy samples the song in "Mercedes Benz (The American Dream)"
 2012 – the song was covered and translated into Ukrainian by singer-songwriter Yuriy Veres for the album 60/70
 2012 – Singer Masha covered the song on her popular YouTube channel on September 22, 2012
 2014 – MonaLisa Twins covered the song on their album MonaLisa Play Beatles & More
 2016 – a re-production feat. Janis Joplin by producer duo Hecchi & Kethmer as a single
 2017 – The Spanish Folk Metal band Mägo de Oz performed a live version of the song in the concert with the Symphony Orchestra of Mexico Diabulus In Ópera. Previously they made a version like B Side of the song "Deja de llorar (y vuélvete a levantar)".
 2017 – Vanessa Carlton performed the song multiple times while touring various cities in North America, often as the final song in the encore.
 2018 – The German band AnnenMayKantereit published an a cappella cover of the song on their YouTube channel featuring the band's lead singer Henning May.

In popular culture
The pianist Glenn Gould used the song prominently in the third and final radio documentary he made for the Canadian Broadcasting Corporation in 1977. The documentary, titled The Quiet in the Land, is part of what is often referred to as Gould's Solitude Trilogy.
The song was used in the 1989 mini-series Bangkok Hilton and in opening of the 2008 German film .
The song has been used several times in car advertisements. Mercedes-Benz used it in television commercials for their cars as early as 1995. The song appeared again in an advertisement which aired on February 6, 2011, during a Super Bowl commercial in addition to advertisements in 2007. Another commercial, for the BMW Z3, had the driver listening to a cassette tape of the song, frowning after Mercedes-Benz was mentioned, and throwing the tape out of the car after the Porsche is mentioned.
In 2011, on the initiative of the British music and lifestyle BLAG Magazine, singer and songwriter Estelle, rapper and producer David Banner and the musician Daley composed the new song "Benz", inspired by Joplin's "Mercedes Benz".
In a 2012 episode of the British TV Series Citizen Khan, the title character sings his own version when driving his yellow Mercedes. "Oh lord bought me a Mercedes-Benz. My friends all drive Datsuns. They are infidels."
In the 2019–2020 Arrowverse crossover, Crisis on Infinite Earths, the song is mentioned by Sara Lance as being the final song recorded by Joplin. In the show's fictional timeline, history was altered to make Joplin's last song "Little Robot Man.”

Certifications

References

1970 songs
Janis Joplin songs
Song recordings produced by Paul A. Rothchild
A cappella songs
Songs about cars
Songs about consumerism